The Women's Baseball Association Korea (WBAK) is the governing body for the women's amateur leagues of baseball in South Korea. WBAK was founded in 2007.

Teams
In 2016, 46 amateur women's baseball teams are under the WBAK.

A list of some of the amateur ladies teams under the WBAK:

External links 
 Women's Baseball Association Korea (WBAK) official website 

Sports governing bodies in South Korea
Sports organizations established in 2007
Baseball governing bodies in Asia